Pecheneg is an extinct Turkic language spoken by the Pechenegs in Eastern Europe (parts of Southern Ukraine, Southern Russia, Moldova, Romania and Hungary) in the 7th–12th centuries. However, names in this language (Beke, Wochun, Lechk, etc) are reported from Hatvan until 1290.

Classfication 
Pecheneg was most likely a member of the Oghuz branch of the Turkic family, but poor documentation and the absence of any descendant languages have prevented linguists from making an accurate classification; most experts would be fairly confident in placing it among the Oghuz languages, but would refuse to classify it further, though it is placed in the Kipchak language family in Glottolog and in the Kipchak–Cuman language family in Linguist List.

Byzantine princess Anna Komnene asserts that the Pechenegs and Cumans spoke the same language, while Mahmud al-Kashgari considered their language to be a corrupted form of Turkic.

References

Extinct languages of Europe
Pechenegs
Turkic languages
Languages attested from the 7th century
Languages extinct in the 12th century